P. J. Scully (born 7 February 1994) is an Irish hurler who plays for Laois Senior Championship club Borris-in-Ossory/Kilcotton and at inter-county level with the Laois senior hurling team. He currently lines out as a corner-back

Career

Scully first came to prominence as a member of the Borris-in-Ossory/Kilcotton club at juvenile and underage levels. He eventually joined the club's senior team and has since won County Championship titles in 2016 and 2020. He simultaneously played with the University of Limerick and was part of their successful 2015 Fitzgibbon Cup-winning team. Scully made his first appearances at inter-county level during a two-year stint with the Laois minor team, before a three-year tenure with the Laois under-21 team. He joined the Laois senior hurling team in 2013, ending the year with a National Hurling League Division 2A title. Scully left the Laois panel midway during the 2019 season, a decision which resulted in him missing the team's Joe McDonagh Cup triumph, however, he returned at the start of the 2021 season.

Career statistics

Honours

University of Limerick
Fitzgibbon Cup: 2015

Borris-in-Ossory/Kilcotton
Laois Senior Hurling Championship: 2016, 2020

Laois
National Hurling League Division 2A: 2013

References

1994 births
Living people
Borris-in-Ossory hurlers
Laois inter-county hurlers